Fanfare is the second studio album released by LA-based artist Jonathan Wilson. It was released in 2013 on the British indie label Bella Union. The album was recorded at Wilson's studio Five Star Studios in Laurel Canyon, Los Angeles.

Overview
The album was recorded over a period of nine months, at Wilson's studio located in Laurel Canyon. Similar to his previous album Gentle Spirit, Wilson continued to collaborate with numerous artists such as Roy Harper, David Crosby, Graham Nash, Benmont Tench, Father John Misty, Patrick Sansone, Dawes among others. Prior to recording the album, Wilson set out to find a grand piano, which was to serve as the centerpiece and main feature on the album and help to achieve a more epic sound than previous. Wilson found a Steinway Grand Piano for sale on Craigslist and was lucky enough to convince the seller for him to rent it for about nine months.

Fanfare features all original Wilson compositions, with the exception of his rendition of Sopwith Camel's "Fazon".

Track listing
All songs written by Jonathan Wilson (except where noted).
"Fanfare" – 7:06
"Dear Friend" – 7:16
"Her Hair is Growing Long" – 4:53 - additional lyrics by Jacqueline Suskin
"Love to Love" – 4:10
"Future Vision" – 5:55
"Moses Pain" – 6:39
"Cecil Taylor" – 6:31
"Illumination" – 6:39
"Desert Trip" – 4:26
"Fazon" – 5:38 - (Sopwith Camel cover) - written by Peter Kraemer, Terry MacNeil, Martin Beard and Norman Mayell
"New Mexico" – 6:41 - lyrics by Roy Harper
"Lovestrong" – 6:32
"All the Way Down" – 5:55

Personnel
"Fanfare"
Jonathan Wilson – Drums, Bass, Piano, Fender Rhodes, Mellotron, Millennium bells, Hammond Organ, Vibes, Percussion and Vocals
Keefus Ciancia - Moog synthesizers
James King - Saxophone
Nate Walcott - Flugelhorn
"Dear Friend"
Jonathan Wilson – Bass, Electric Guitar, Mellotron, Vibes and Vocals
Richard Gowen – Drums
Jason Borger - Hammond Organ and Piano
Omar Velasco - Electric Guitar
"Her Hair Is Growing Long"
Jonathan Wilson - Guitars, Bass, Drums, Percussion, Hammond Organ, Synthesizer and Vocals
"Love To Love"
Jonathan Wilson - 6 string and 12 string Electric Guitars, Acoustic Guitar, Piano, Percussion and Vocals
Richard Gowen - Drums
Dan Horne - Bass
Omar Velasco - Guitar
Jason Borger - Hammond Organ
"Future Vision"
Jonathan Wilson - Drums, Bass, Electric Guitar, Acoustic 12 string Guitars, Piano, Hammond Organ, Synthesizers, Clavinet and Vocals
Josh Tillman - Harmony Vocals
Gabriel Noel - Cello
"Moses Pain"
Jonathan Wilson - Bass, Acoustic Guitar, Harmonica, Vibes and Vocals
Richard Gowen - Drums and Percussion
Mike Campell - Slide Guitar
Benmont Tench - Piano
Jason Borger - Hammond Organ
Jackson Browne, Graham Nash, Josh Tillman and Jenny O. - Harmony Singers
"Cecil Taylor"
Jonathan Wilson - Guitars, Bass, Piano, Hammond Organ, Drums, Percussion and Vocals
Nate Walcott - Flugelhorn
David Crosby - Vocal Solo and Harmony Vocals
Graham Nash - Harmony Vocals
"Illumination"
Jonathan Wilson - Drums, Bass, Electric Guitars, Piano, Percussion, Hammond Organ and Vocals
"Desert Trip"
Jonathan Wilson - Acoustic Guitar, Percussion and Vocals
Richard Gowen - Drums
Omar Velasco - Nashville Guitar
Gabriel Noel - Upright Bass
Jason Borger - Piano and Mellotron
Josh Tillman - Velvet Vocal Pillows
Jackson Browne - Ending Vocals
"Fazon"
Jonathan Wilson - Drums, Bass, Guitars, Piano, Mellotron, Bicycle Wheel and Vocals
James King - Saxophone
Farmer Dave Scher - Harmony Vocals
"New Mexico"
Jonathan Wilson - Drums, Bass Guitars, Organ, Dulcimer, Percussion and Vocals
Omar Velasco - Harmony Vocals
James King - Flute
"Lovestrong"
Jonathan Wilson - Electric Guitar, Organ, Clavinet, Synthesizer and Vocals
Richard Gowen - Drums
Dan Horne - Bass
Omar Velasco - Mellotron
Benmont Tench - Piano
Gabriel Noel - Cello 
"All The Way Down"
Jonathan Wilson - Acoustic Guitar, Piano, Percussion, Vibes, Mellotron, Stratocaster and Vocals
Richard Owen - Drums
Dan Horne - Bass
Omar Velasco - Electric Guitar
Bryce Gonzales - Chamber Radio
Patrick Sansone - Strings Arranged and Conducted

Production Credits
Produced and Recorded by Jonathan Wilson at Fivestarstudios in Los Angeles
Engineered by Bryce Gonzales
Mixed by Jonathan Wilson and Bryce Gonzales at Groovemasters Studio in Santa Monica, California; Assisted by Bil Lane and Rich Tosi with the help of Ed Wong and Eddie Santos Groove Masters
Mastered by JJ Golden at Golden Mastering in Ventura, California

References

http://www.songsofjonathanwilson.com

2013 albums
Jonathan Wilson (musician) albums
Folk albums by American artists
Albums produced by Jonathan Wilson (musician)
Bella Union albums